Marlenis Costa Blanco (born July 30, 1973) is a Cuban volleyball player, world champion and Olympic champion. She was a member of the Cuban winning team at the 1992, 1996 and 2000 Olympic games.

References

External links

1973 births
Living people
Cuban women's volleyball players
Olympic volleyball players of Cuba
Volleyball players at the 1992 Summer Olympics
Volleyball players at the 1996 Summer Olympics
Volleyball players at the 2000 Summer Olympics
Olympic gold medalists for Cuba
Olympic medalists in volleyball
Medalists at the 2000 Summer Olympics
Medalists at the 1996 Summer Olympics
Medalists at the 1992 Summer Olympics
Pan American Games medalists in volleyball
Pan American Games gold medalists for Cuba
Pan American Games silver medalists for Cuba
Medalists at the 1991 Pan American Games
Medalists at the 1995 Pan American Games
Medalists at the 1999 Pan American Games